Kevin McManus may refer to:
Kevin McManus (politician), American politician from Missouri
Kevin McManus (filmmaker), American filmmaker
Kevin McManus (guitarist), of Dahlia Seed